Corypha (gebang palm, buri palm or talipot palm) is a genus of palms (family Arecaceae), native to India, Malaysia, Indonesia, the Philippines, New Guinea and northeastern Australia (Cape York Peninsula, Queensland). They are fan palms (subfamily Coryphoideae), and the leaves have a long petiole terminating in a rounded fan of numerous leaflets.

All are large palms with leaves ranging from 2–5 metres in length. They reach heights of 20–40 m and with a trunk diameter of up to 1-2.5 m. All the species are monocarpic and die after flowering. The genus is relatively slow growing and can take many years to form a trunk.

Species include:

Gallery

Uses
In the Philippines, buri trees, like the sago palm, are used as sources of starch made into starch balls called landang. These are traditionally cooked into various desserts and dishes, most notably the binignit.

The leaves are often used for thatching or can be woven into baskets, etc. Three kinds of fibres, namely buri (unopened leaf fibers), raffia (mature leaf fibers), and buntal (leaf petiole fiber), may be obtained from the plant. The midrib of the leaves are also used for weaving hats in the Philippines known as calasiao hats. The Buntal Hat Festival is celebrated in Baliuag, Bulacan yearly every 6th of May.

References

PACSOA: Corypha index
PACSOA: Corypha utan in Australia
Kunth, Karl Sigismund Corypha miraguama, Nov. Gen., 1816, 1, p. 298. Accessed 2012-8-4. 
The Old Market Gardens and Nurseries of London — No. 10, (52 MB file from archive.org) Journal of Horticulture, Cottage Gardner v. 57, 29 March 1877, p. 238. Accessed 2012-7-31. The Journal records John Fraser as bringing Corypha miraguama back from Cuba in 1807. See also Kunth, 1816, same location.

External links

 
Arecaceae genera
Flora of Indomalesia
Taxa named by Carl Linnaeus